Charalampos Christopoulos (Andritsaina, possibly 1809 – Athens, 8 April 1871) was a Greek 19th-century politician, MP and six times minister during the 1855–1870 period.

Sources 
 Charalampos Christopoulos biographical information from the Institute of Modern Greek Studies
 
 Λήμμα Χριστόπουλος Χαράλαμπος, Εγκυκλοπαιδικό Λεξικό Ελευθερουδάκη, Athens, 1931
 Kostis Ailianos, Charalampos Chr. Christopoulos, minister of foreign affairs, three days, four months... 1865, 1870–1871, Nea Estia, year 88, volume 176, issue 1863, Sept. 2014, p. 121–144
 Antonis Makrydimitris, The foreign ministers of Greece 1829–2000, Kastaniotis publications, Athens, 2000, p. 57

References 

Foreign ministers of Greece
Ministers of the Interior of Greece
People from Andritsaina
1871 deaths
Greek MPs 1850–1853
Greek MPs 1865–1868
1809 births